Saskia Bartusiak (born 9 September 1982) is a German retired footballer. She played as a centre back.

Career

Club
Bartusiak began her career at FV 09 Eschersheim. In 1996, she left the club to join FSV Frankfurt where she made her Bundesliga debut. After five years, she transferred to local rivals 1. FFC Frankfurt in 2005. Playing in central defence, Bartusiak has been an important player for FFC Frankfurt's success in the following years. She won two Bundesliga championships and three German Cup titles at the club. In the 2005–06 and 2007–08 season she also won the UEFA Women's Cup with Frankfurt.

International
Bartusiak made her debut in the German national team in a friendly against the Netherlands in April 2007. She was part of Germany's winning team at the 2007 FIFA Women's World Cup, appearing in one match, the opening game against Argentina. Bartusiak has since been called up for all major tournaments for Germany. She again was a reserve player at the 2008 Summer Olympics, where she won a bronze medal. At the 2009 European Championship, Bartusiak became a regular starter for Germany, winning her first European title. She has been called up for Germany's 2011 FIFA Women's World Cup squad.

She was named captain of the German team on 17 September 2015.

She announced her retirement from the national team in August 2016 after leading Germany to its first Olympic gold medal in women's football.

International goals
Scores and results list Germany's goal tally first:

Source:

Honours

Club
1. FFC Frankfurt
 UEFA Women's Cup: Winner 2005–06, 2007–08, 2014–15
 Bundesliga: Winner 2006–07, 2007–08
 German Cup: Winner 2006–07, 2007–08, 2010–11, 2013–14

International
 FIFA World Cup: Winner 2007
 UEFA European Football Championship: Winner 2009, 2013
 Summer Olympic Games: Bronze medal, 2008, Gold medal, 2016
 UEFA U-18 Women's Championship: Winner 2000
 Algarve Cup: Winner 2012

Individual
 Silbernes Lorbeerblatt: 2007, 2016
 UEFA Women's Championship All-Star Team: 2013
 FIFA Women's World Cup All Star Team: 2011

References

External links
 Official fansite 
 Profile at DFB 
 Player German domestic football stats at DFB 
 
 
 
 
 

1982 births
Living people
German women's footballers
Germany women's international footballers
2007 FIFA Women's World Cup players
Footballers at the 2008 Summer Olympics
Footballers at the 2016 Summer Olympics
Olympic footballers of Germany
Olympic gold medalists for Germany
Olympic bronze medalists for Germany
FIFA Women's World Cup-winning players
Footballers from Frankfurt
1. FFC Frankfurt players
FSV Frankfurt (women) players
Olympic medalists in football
2011 FIFA Women's World Cup players
2015 FIFA Women's World Cup players
Medalists at the 2008 Summer Olympics
Medalists at the 2016 Summer Olympics
Women's association football defenders
Frauen-Bundesliga players
UEFA Women's Championship-winning players
FIFA Century Club